Kinwun Mingyi Monastery, also known as the Thakawun Monastery, is a historic Buddhist monastery in Maha Aungmye Township, Mandalay, Burma. The wooden monastery dates to 1879, built by the Kinwun Mingyi U Kaung. 

Built completely out of teak, the monastery includes Western motifs including Corinthian pillars, friezes and arches inspired by the Kinwun Mingyi's embassy mission to Europe. The monastery design features a terrace surrounded by a rotunda. The monastery was designed by European architects, namely M. Comodo, an Italian, and M. Bonvallein, a Frenchman.

See also 

 Kyaung

References 

Monasteries in Myanmar
Buddhist temples in Mandalay
19th-century Buddhist temples
Religious buildings and structures completed in 1839